Crystal Hefner (née Harris, born April 29, 1986) is an American model who was the Playboy Playmate of the Month for December 2009, and the third wife of Playboy publisher Hugh Hefner from December 2012 until his death in September 2017.

Early life
Her father, Ray Harris, was a singer and songwriter. She majored in psychology at San Diego State University.

Career
She appeared as "Co-ed of the Week" on Playboy.com magazine during the week of October 30, 2008. Beginning in late 2009, Harris appeared in one of the seasons of E!'s The Girls Next Door reality show.

In April 2010, Harris signed a recording contract with Organica Music Group, a division of Universal Music Group, managed by record producer Michael Blakey.

In 2012, Harris co-designed a range of swimwear with Australian designer and owner of Veve Glamor Swimwear, Vanessa Bryce. Then in 2014, she announced a line of "intimates, athleisure and loungewear" that was co-designed with Rhonda Shear to be sold through her website.

Personal life
In January 2009, Crystal started dating Hugh Hefner, who was 60 years her senior. She joined the Shannon twins after his previous "number one girlfriend", Holly Madison, had ended their seven-year relationship. On December 24, 2010, she became engaged to Hefner, to become his third wife. Harris broke off their engagement on June 14, 2011, five days before their planned wedding. In anticipation of the wedding, the July issue of Playboy, which reached store shelves and customers' homes within days of the wedding date, featured Harris on the cover and in a photo spread, as well. The headline on the cover read "America's Princess, Introducing Mrs. Crystal Hefner." Hefner and Harris subsequently reconciled and married on December 31, 2012. She remained married to Hefner until his death on September 27, 2017.

In 2016, Hefner announced on her social media outlets that she had been diagnosed with Lyme disease and toxic mold before finding her symptoms were also due to "breast implant illness". Hefner stated that she experienced "brain fog" and "chronic fatigue" due to the implants but had them removed, which alleviated some of the symptoms.

In 2020, Hefner claimed she almost died due to a fat transfer procedure considered to be plastic surgery. In 2022 Hefner confirmed she had removed her breast implants and "everything fake" from her body. As of 2023 Hefner confirmed she is writing a tell all memoir about her life and her experiences at the Playboy mansion.

References

External links

 
 
 

1986 births
Living people
American expatriates in England
American people of English descent
San Diego State University alumni
2000s Playboy Playmates
21st-century American musicians
Participants in American reality television series
21st-century American women musicians
21st-century American singers
21st-century American women singers
Hefner family